Jalen Wilkerson (born December 21, 1995) is a former American football defensive end. He played college football at Florida State.

Early years
Wilkerson attended Coffee High School in Douglas, Georgia. He committed to play football for the Florida State Seminoles in May 2014s.

College career
Wilkerson attended Florida State from 2015–2017, redshirting the 2015 season. From 2016–2017, he played in 16 games for the Seminoles. After the 2017, season, he declared for the 2018 NFL Draft.

Professional career

Houston Texans
Wilkerson signed with the Houston Texans as an undrafted free agent on May 11, 2018, but was waived three days later.

Washington Redskins
Wilkerson signed with the Washington Redskins on August 11, 2018, but was waived on August 18.

On August 20, 2018, it was reported that Wilkerson's football career was over, with Wilkerson writing in a Facebook post, "Closing the football chapter of my life, marking off every goal I ever set, is beyond amazing. I’m so thankful for being able to walk away in peace and good health. I know this next chapter of my life will be exactly where God needs me most. No fame nor money is worth my life. I have a daughter who depends on and needs her father.”

References

External links
Florida State Seminoles bio

1995 births
Living people
People from Douglas County, Georgia
Sportspeople from the Atlanta metropolitan area
Players of American football from Georgia (U.S. state)
American football defensive ends
Florida State Seminoles football players
Houston Texans players
Washington Redskins players